Kadyrovo (Qäźer) is a rural locality (a village) in Atarshinsky Selsoviet, Belokataysky District, Bashkortostan, Russia. The population was 128 as of 2010. There are 5 streets.

Geography 
Kadyrovo is located 32 km southeast of Novobelokatay (the district's administrative centre) by road. Karantrav is the nearest rural locality.

References 

Rural localities in Belokataysky District